Early Joys is a 1956 Soviet  drama film directed by Vladimir Basov.

Plot 
1910. A small Volga town. Kirill Izvekov, a technical school student, is only looking for his place in life, and a revolutionary struggle is unfolding around.

Cast 
 Viktor Korshunov as Izvekov
 Mikhail Nazvanov as Pastukhov
 Vladimir Druzhnikov as Tsvetukhin
 Vladimir Yemelyanov as Ragozin
 Tatyana Konyukhova as Liza
 Roza Makagonova as Anna
 Daniil Ilchenko as Old Man
 Boris Novikov as Shubnikov
 Nina Menshikova as Ksana Ragozina
 Yury Yakovlev as Dibich
 Olga Zhiznyeva as Isvekova

See also
 An Unusual Summer (1957)

References

External links 
 

1956 films
1950s Russian-language films
Soviet drama films
1956 drama films
Mosfilm films
Films directed by Vladimir Basov
Films based on Russian novels